Russula versicolor is a mushroom in the genus Russula. It is considered inedible.

See also
List of Russula species

References

External links

versicolor
Fungi of Europe
Fungi described in 1931